Dariusz Nowak (born 23 April 1978) is a Polish rower. He competed in the men's eight event at the 2004 Summer Olympics.

References

1978 births
Living people
Polish male rowers
Olympic rowers of Poland
Rowers at the 2004 Summer Olympics
People from Włocławek